, known by the pen name , is a manga artist known for creating the Zatch Bell! franchise.  Starting off an assistant for Kazuhiro Fujita on his manga Ushio & Tora, he began creating several one-shots for the Weekly Shōnen Sunday shōnen manga anthology such as Bird Man (about a young pilot), Hero Ba-Ban (about a cheerful, but weak superhero) and Genmai Blade (about a teenage medicinal exorcist, of which he created both a one-shot and a two-part story).  By 1999, he had created the series Newtown Heroes, which was published in Shōnen Sunday Super, a seasonal publication featuring upcoming manga artists and one-shots from the main Sunday book.

Biography

Debut
In 2001, Raiku started the manga series Konjiki no Gash!!, which began publication in Shogakukan's Weekly Shōnen Sunday, and in 2003, inspired an anime version (Konjiki no Gash Bell!!) produced by Toei Animation. In English-speaking countries, both the manga and anime are known as Zatch Bell!. In one chapter of the Konjiki no Gash Bell!! manga, Raiku makes an appearance with his own story, and also plays the role of Umagon's partner in the game, Konjiki no Gash Bell!!: Electric Arena (prior to the introduction of Kafka Sunbeam). In 2003, Konjiki no Gash!! received the 48th Shogakukan Manga Award in the Shōnen category.

Civil trial
In June 2008, Raiku brought a case against Shogakukan to Tokyo District Court because they lost five of his coloured works. He demanded 3,300,000 yen as compensation. According to the beginning of his statement, he decided to do it because he does not want publishers and their editors to look down on manga artists. In addition, Raiku was treated extremely badly for a long time. Moreover, the price of compensation represented by Shogakukan was only 500,000 yen. Raiku claimed that they had underestimated him too much.

On July 28, 2008, they had their first public session. Shogakukan agreed they were responsible for the loss with a reservation on financial value of the lost works as it was not clear. Recommended by the judge, both parties agreed to settle the claim.
After the case was settled, Makoto Raiku announced he would no longer do business with Shogakukan, and switched to Kodansha. His first work for Kodansha was Animal Land, which was serialized in Bessatsu Shonen Magazine.

Self-Publishing
Raiku's third serialization, Vector Ball, ran in Kodansha's Weekly Shōnen Magazine from April 2016 until its abrupt end in March 2017, after Raiku refused to continue the story based on suggestions from his editor that he had previously agreed to follow.  Over the next several years, he re-released his 3 serializations as ebooks, with both Konjiki no Gash!! and Animal Land receiving bonus content.

In 2022, Raiku started a new manga studio, Birgdin Board, under which he had ownership of his previous manga. He began working on a new series, a sequel to Konjiki no Gash!! which was published online by Raiku and Birgdin Board starting in March 2022.

Works
Bird Man

Associated Manga Authors

Master
Kazuhiro Fujita

Fellow Assistants under Tanabe
Kazurou Inoue
Tatsuya Kaneda
Nobuyuki Anzai

Raiku's Assistants
Yellow Tanabe
Aiko Koyama
Youhei Sakai

References

External links
    
Birgdin Board website 
Raiku Makoto's official blog (current) 
Raiku Makoto's official blog (old) 
 

Manga artists from Gifu Prefecture
Living people
1974 births